Contamana is a town in the Loreto Region in northeastern Peru. It is the capital of both Ucayali Province and Contamana District and has an urban population of about 15,036 (as of 2007). It has one airport.

References

External links 
 Portal Oficial de Contamana - Municipalidad Provincial de Ucayali - Ucayali Province Council official website
    Fotos de Contamana

Populated places in the Loreto Region